Manduca prestoni is a moth of the  family Sphingidae. It is known from Brazil, Ecuador and Bolivia.

It is similar in appearance to several other members of the genus Manduca, but a number of differences distinguish it from Manduca lefeburii, to which it most closely compares, particularly in the transverse dark band on the forewing upperside that runs through the discal spot, which is narrower, less diffuse and does not reach the outer margin.

Adults have been recorded in October.

References

Manduca
Moths described in 1923